AFI Ploiești is a shopping mall located in the city center of Ploiești, Romania, which was opened in October 2013, following an investment of over EUR 50 million.

Location

The shopping mall is located 850 meters from the City Center, on Gheorghe Doja Street, along the main access road from the North-East, a position that transforms the shopping mall into the main commercial destination within the City Center.

Facilities

The mix of tenants includes over 100 national and international fashion brands. The mall includes entertainment and leisure area of over 7,000 sqmand 1,000 parking spaces.

References

External links

Shopping malls established in 2013
Shopping malls in Romania
Leadership in Energy and Environmental Design gold certified buildings